Jeff King (born 19 December 1995) is an English professional footballer who plays as a defender for National League side Chesterfield.

King started his career in non-league playing for Altrincham, Prescot Cables, Nantwich Town, Kendal Town, Trafford, Ashton United, Witton Albion and Droylsden, before joining the academy of Bolton Wanderers. He made his debut for Bolton in an EFL Cup match against West Ham United. King signed for Scottish Premiership club St Mirren in June 2018, but was released in the following January.

Early life 
King played for various Junior League sides in the Merseyside area; including The Mags, Warner Portcullis, The Celts and Connect.

Playing career

Non-League 
King played mostly for the youth team at Altrincham appearing regularly on the first team bench, but making his only first team appearance against Tranmere Rovers in the Cheshire Senior Cup. He had a brief loan spell at Prescot Cables from March 2014 until the end of the season, before returning to train with the Altrincham first team.

King moved to Nantwich Town in September 2014, whilst the club was in the midst of an injury crisis. He made his debut against Halesowen Town. In October 2014 he moved to Kendal Town. In January 2015, King moved to Trafford from Kendal Town, citing transportation difficulties.

In September 2015, King moved to Ashton United. In March 2016 he moved to Witton Albion. He played in the Mid-Cheshire Senior Cup final against 1874 Northwich which Witton lost 3–0. On 19 April 2016, King was charged by the FA with misconduct under Rule E3, allegedly using abusive, race-related language in a match played on 5 December 2015 whilst still at previous club Ashton United. He was subsequently suspended for five matches, fined £100 and ordered to complete an FA equality course.

In August 2016, King signed for Droylsden.

Bolton Wanderers 
By November 2016, King was playing for Bolton's under-23 side. Bolton initially tried to register King's promotion to the first team in the 2016–17 season but due to a transfer embargo, the EFL prohibited the move. King extended his first professional contract with the club in July 2017. He joined the first team on a preseason trip to Scotland. Going into the season it seemed unlikely that King would receive any game time at Bolton, as the club were again restricted to a squad of only 23 professionals.

On 14 September 2017 the embargo was lifted and King was registered with the first team. He made his Bolton debut on 19 September 2017 in a loss against West Ham United in the third round of the EFL Cup, playing 80 minutes. He was released by Bolton at the end of the 2017–18 season.

St Mirren
On 22 June 2018, King signed a two-year contract with Scottish Premiership club St Mirren. He was released by St Mirren in January 2019.

Halifax Town
In August 2019, King signed for National League club Halifax Town. On 16 August 2020, King signed a new one-year deal for Halifax. King left the club at the end of the 2020–21 season following a season where he won his side's player of the season award as well as being named in the league's official Team of the Season.

Chesterfield
On 24 June 2021, King agreed a deal to join fellow National League side Chesterfield.

Style of play 
King was previously considered an attacking midfielder that can also cover the centre forward position,  but since moving to Halifax he has been converted into a right wing back. He is known as a dead-ball specialist, with a large proportion of his goals occurring from set pieces.

Personal life 
He is the nephew of former Altrincham player and manager John King.

Career statistics

Club

Honours
Individual 
2020–21 National League Team of the Year

References 

1995 births
Living people
English footballers
Footballers from Liverpool
Association football midfielders
Altrincham F.C. players
Prescot Cables F.C. players
Nantwich Town F.C. players
Kendal Town F.C. players
Trafford F.C. players
Ashton United F.C. players
Witton Albion F.C. players
Droylsden F.C. players
Bolton Wanderers F.C. players
F.C. United of Manchester players
St Mirren F.C. players
FC Halifax Town players
Chesterfield F.C. players
English Football League players
Northern Football League players
National League (English football) players